Catupiry is one of the most popular brands of  cheese in Brazil. It was developed by Italian immigrant Mario Silvestrini in the state of Minas Gerais in 1911. The name derives from the Tupi word meaning "excellent".

Catupiry is a soft, mild-tasting cheese that can be spread over toasts, crackers and bread buns or used in cooking. Because of its low level of acidity, catupiry has become an ingredient in various dishes.

Currently, catupiry has four factories, two in São Paulo in the municipalities of Bebedouro and Santa Fé do Sul and the others in Doverlândia, in Goiás, and Santa Vitória, in Minas Gerais. The company is currently managed by six families, all heirs of the Silvestrini family. The company has a turnover of around R$ 600 million per year and is present in five countries, including the United States, Canada and Japan.

See also 
List of Brazilian dishes

References

External links
Official site

Brazilian cheeses
Cow's-milk cheeses
Brazilian cuisine
Products introduced in 1911